Graham Stabell is a former Australian racing cyclist. He finished in second place in the Australian National Road Race Championships in 1948, 1949, 1951  and 1952.

Stabell won the Blue Ribband for the fastest time in the Melbourne to Warrnambool Classic in 1951 and 1952.

References

External links
 

Year of birth missing (living people)
Living people
Australian male cyclists
Place of birth missing (living people)